The Pintados Festival is a cultural-religious celebration in Tacloban based on the body-painting traditions of the ancient tattooed "pintados" warriors.   In 1986, the Pintados Foundation, Inc. was formed by the people of Tacloban to organize this festival in honor of Sr. Santo Niño.  Years later, it was merged with the Kasadyaan Festival which is always held on June 29.

History 
"Pintados," or "painted people," is a term that refers to the native Filipinos who Spanish colonizers encountered in the 16th century. Centuries of Spanish occupation affected Filipino culture and much of the history surrounding tribal tattoos is concentrated on the Visayan (including the people of Tacloban) and Igorot peoples. Due to their relative isolation, ethnic groups such as the Ifugao have resisted Spanish cooptation more so than others in the Philippines.

Events 
The Pintados-Kasadyaan festival includes multiple events throughout the celebration. These events are called the Festival of festivals of Leyte, the Ritual Dance Presentation of Pintados Festival, and the “Pagrayhay” during the Grand Parade.

See also
Sangyaw

References

Cultural festivals in the Philippines
Visayan festivals
Culture of Leyte (province)
Tourist attractions in Tacloban
Christian festivals in the Philippines